A by-election was held for the United Kingdom parliament constituency of Wirral South, in Merseyside, England, on 27 February 1997. The seat became vacant on the death of Conservative Party Member of Parliament Barry Porter, and was won by Labour's Ben Chapman.

The Conservative loss in this seat, which came close to the last possible date for a general election, meant that they no longer had a majority in the House of Commons. Wirral South was the last in a run of significant Conservative losses, following a period of dissatisfaction with the Major years. This was the last Conservative loss to Labour in a by-election until the 2012 Corby by-election. Labour has held this seat since the by-election.

Result

Previous result

Notes

External links
British Parliamentary By Elections:  Campaign literature from the by-election

See also
List of United Kingdom by-elections
List of parliamentary constituencies in Merseyside

Politics of the Metropolitan Borough of Wirral
1997 elections in the United Kingdom
1997 in England
1990s in Merseyside
By-elections to the Parliament of the United Kingdom in Merseyside constituencies